Arianna Fitts (2-years-old) and her mother Nicole Fitts (32-years-old) were reported missing on April 5, 2016, in San Francisco, California. However, Nicole Fitts was last seen on April 1, 2016 and Arianna had not been seen since mid-February 2016. Arianna Fitts is still missing, while her mother's body was discovered buried in McLaren Park on April 8.

Background 
Both mother and daughter have ties to San Mateo, Oakland, Fresno, Santa Cruz and Silicon Valley and regularly visited Southern California. 

Family members of the Fitts alerted San Francisco Police on April 5, 2016 that Nicole and Arianna Fitts were missing and Nicole Fitts was last seen on April 1 after receiving a phone call to meet her daughters babysitter. She was believed to have traveled from her job at a Best Buy store on Harrison Street via a Municipal Railway Vehicle on the Third Street Corridor around 9:45 pm, wearing a blue Best Buy shirt. Her daughter Arianna, was last seen in late February in Oakland, California. 

On April 8, a gardener in the John McLaren Park discovered a large piece of wood resting behind a clump of ivy covered bushes with an odd silver character painted on it. Underneath the wood, the body of Nicole Fitts was discovered in a fetal position, in an uncovered, but previously covered by the wood, shallow grave. After her body was discovered, police focused their attention on the individuals who watched Arianna while her mother commuted 2 hours to go to work.

Search for the missing child 
Efforts are ongoing to locate the missing toddler. The police investigated homes in Emeryville, Oakland, and Daly City, California and cited that those who had last seen Fitts were uncooperative with the initial interview process. Police identified three people of interest at a press conference, who were named as Helena and Devin Martin and Siolo Hearne. The sisters of Nicole Fitts told media outlets that they still believe that Arianna is alive, and one told reporters that she believed; "Someone wanted Arianna as their own [child]." 

The family created a website to highlight the search, and offered a $10,000 USD reward to anyone with information that may help them locate Arianna and her safe return. Best Buy also offered a $10,000 USD reward for direct information regarding Arianna. In 2021, police raised the reward for information about Arianna to $100,000 USD. In 2022, San Francisco and the FBI announced the increase of the reward for leads to $250,000.

In April 2021 San Francisco Police released a rendering of a forensic sketch of Arianna that had been age progressed to 7-years-old, along with two crime bulletins to the public.

Media depictions 
In February 2020, her case was profiled on crime podcast The Vanished. The Vanished is a podcast featuring missing people and their cases. The case was also profiled on another crime podcast Inside the FBI in June 2021 and the podcast was promoted on the FBI's Twitter page in an effort to reach more people who could help in the case.
In November 2022, the Crime Junkie podcast profiled this case.

See also
List of people who disappeared

References 

2010s missing person cases
2016 in California
April 2016 events in the United States
Death in San Francisco
Missing American children
Missing person cases in California